Medvezhye is a rural locality (a selo) and the administrative center of Rossypnyanskoye Rural Settlement, Kalacheyevsky District, Voronezh Oblast, Russia. The population was 381 as of 2010. There are 9 streets.

Geography 
Medvezhye is located 41 km northwest of Kalach (the district's administrative centre) by road. Rossypnoye is the nearest rural locality.

References 

Rural localities in Kalacheyevsky District